Ramgati is an upazila (sub-district) of Lakshmipur District in Bangladesh, part of the Chittagong Division. The Government of Bangladesh plans to build an airport in this upazila.

History
 
Ramgati is home to historic infrastructure such as the Bedar Bakhsh Mosque in Borokheri. The origin of Ramgati is said to have been from a man named Ramkrishna who had a large mercantile centre in the area known as a gôdi in the Bengali language. From this, the area came to be known as Ramer gadi (meaning Ram's godi) and was later corrupted into Ramgati. Initially, a thana was established in the Borokheri Union in 1862. In 1933, the Baluchar Islamia Senior Alim Madrasa was founded. Five years later, the Char Alexander Alia Madrasa opened.

In 1957, the Government of Pakistan's Irrigation Department constructed the earthen 13.68km Meghna Cross-Dam I across a major branch of the Meghna River which flowed between Ramgati and the Noakhali mainland. As a result, river flow was diverted westwards and by 1965, 207km2 of land was reclaimed.  In October 1960, a severe cyclonic storm affected Ramgati leading to 3500 deaths.

During the Bangladesh Liberation War of 1971, a brawl took place in Zamindar Hat between the Bengali freedom fighters against the Pakistan Army soldiers and its collaborating Razakars leading to the death of 17 Pakistan Army soldiers and numerous Razakars. On the night of 3 December, a Mitra Bahini tank arrived to Ramgati and the Pakistani soldiers and their allies fled the area leading to the liberation of Ramgati in 4 December. In 1972, the Borokheri Thana outpost was relocated to Ramgati Bazar as a consequence of river erosion. The Ramgati Thana was upgraded to an upazila (sub-district) in 1983 as part of the erstwhile President of Bangladesh Hussain Muhammad Ershad's decentralisation project.

Geography

The Meghna River flows into the Bay of Bengal on the west side of Ramgati Bazar, and there is a natural beach there. Ramgati is bounded by Kamalnagar Upazila to the north, Noakhali Sadar Upazila to its east, Hatiya Upazila to its south and Tazumuddin Upazila in the west.

Demographics

According to the 1991 Bangladesh census, Ramgati had a population of 335,243. Ramgati has 59,387 households. Males constituted 51.57% of the population, and females 48.43%. The population aged 18 or over was 146,035. Ramgati had an average literacy rate of 19.9% (7+ years), against the national average of 32.4%.

Administration

Ramgati Upazila is divided into Ramgati Municipality and eight union parishads: Borokheri, Char Abdullah, Char Alexandar, Char Algi, Char Badam, Char Gazi, Char Poragacha, and Char Ramiz. The union parishads are subdivided into 50 mauzas and 39 villages.

Ramgati Municipality is subdivided into 9 wards and 11 mahallas.

Education and facilities
Ramgati had an average literacy rate of 19.9% (7+ years), against the national average of 32.4%. Ramgati is home to 46 madrasas and 105 mosques. Some notable mosques include the Ramgati Central Jame Mosque, Bedar Bakhsh Mosque and the Char Poragacha Mosque.

Notable people
Abdur Rab Chowdhury, Supreme Court lawyer
A. S. M. Abdur Rab, former minister and inaugural secretary-general of the Jatiya Samajtantrik Dal
Mohammad Toaha, language activist
Thanaullah Nuri, journalist

See also
 Upazilas of Bangladesh
 Districts of Bangladesh
 Divisions of Bangladesh

References

Upazilas of Lakshmipur District